Marseillevirus is a genus of viruses, in the family Marseilleviridae. There are two species in this genus. It is the prototype of a family of nucleocytoplasmic large DNA viruses (NCLDV) of eukaryotes (commonly known as Giant Viruses). It was isolated from amoeba.

Taxonomy
The genus contains the following species:
 Marseillevirus marseillevirus
 Senegalvirus marseillevirus

History
The virus is named after the French town of Marseille.

Since the description of the first virus in this family several others have been discovered. These have been named after the area they were discovered. This family includes Brazilian Marseillevirus, Cannes 8 virus, Insectomime virus, Lausannevirus, Melbournevirus, Port-Miou virus, Senegalvirus, Tunisvirus and Tokyovirus.

Structure
Viruses in Marseillevirus have icosahedral geometries. The diameter is around 250 nm. The genome has 457 open reading frames and is circular. The genome has a length of 368 kb, with a G+C content of 44.73%. It encodes a minimum of 49 proteins.

The genome of the virus includes typical NCLDV core genes and genes apparently obtained from eukaryotic hosts and their parasites or symbionts, both bacterial and viral, through probably horizontal gene transfer mechanism.

Life cycle
Viral replication is nucleo-cytoplasmic. DNA-templated transcription is the method of transcription. Amoeba serve as the natural host.

See also
Other giant viruses:
 Mimivirus
 Mamavirus
 Emiliania huxleyi virus 86

References

External links
 Viralzone: Marseillevirus
 ICTV

Marseilleviridae
Nucleocytoplasmic large DNA viruses
Virus genera